Reino Richard Poutanen (21 February 1928 – 14 April 2007) was a Finnish rower who competed in the 1956 Summer Olympics and in the 1960 Summer Olympics. He was born in Turku. In 1956 he was a crew member of the Finnish boat which won the bronze medal in the coxed fours event. He was also part of the Finnish boat which was eliminated in the repêchage of the coxless four competition. Four years later he was eliminated with the Finnish boat in the semi-finals of the coxed four event.

External links
 Reino Poutanen's profile at Sports Reference.com

1928 births
2007 deaths
Finnish male rowers
Olympic rowers of Finland
Rowers at the 1956 Summer Olympics
Rowers at the 1960 Summer Olympics
Olympic bronze medalists for Finland
Olympic medalists in rowing
Medalists at the 1956 Summer Olympics
European Rowing Championships medalists
Sportspeople from Turku